Raf Raf is a north eastern town and commune in the Bizerte Governorate, Tunisia. As of 2004 it had a population of 9,839.

See also
List of cities in Tunisia

References

Populated coastal places in Tunisia
Communes of Tunisia
Populated places in Bizerte Governorate
Tunisia geography articles needing translation from French Wikipedia